In mathematics, a Grothendieck space, named after Alexander Grothendieck, is a Banach space  in which every sequence in its continuous dual space  that converges in the weak-* topology   (also known as the topology of pointwise convergence) will also converge when  is endowed with  which is the weak topology induced on  by its bidual. Said differently, a Grothendieck space is a Banach space for which a sequence in its dual space converges weak-* if and only if it converges weakly.

Characterizations 
Let  be a Banach space. Then the following conditions are equivalent:
  is a Grothendieck space,
 every weak*-continuous function on the dual  is weakly Riemann integrable.

Examples 

 Every reflexive Banach space is a Grothendieck space.
 Grothendieck spaces which are not reflexive include the space  of all continuous functions on a Stonean compact space  and the space  for a positive measure  (a Stonean compact space is a Hausdorff compact space in which the closure of every open set is open).
 Jean Bourgain proved that the space  of bounded holomorphic functions on the disk is a Grothendieck space.

See also

References 

 J. Diestel, Geometry of Banach spaces, Selected Topics, Springer, 1975.
 J. Diestel, J. J. Uhl: Vector measures. Providence, R.I.: American Mathematical Society, 1977. .

  
 Nisar A. Lone, on weak Riemann integrablity of weak* - continuous functions. Mediterranean journal of Mathematics,  2017. 

Banach spaces